Ewaryst Antoni Łój (August 30, 1912 in Strzelno – July 4, 1973 in Poznań) was a Polish basketball player who competed in the 1936 Summer Olympics.

He was part of the Polish basketball team which finished fourth in the Olympic tournament. He played in all six matches.

References

External links
profile

1912 births
1973 deaths
People from Strzelno
Polish men's basketball players
Olympic basketball players of Poland
Basketball players at the 1936 Summer Olympics
Sportspeople from Kuyavian-Pomeranian Voivodeship
Lech Poznań (basketball) players